{{Album ratings
|rev1 = Allmusic
|rev1score = 
|rev2 = Christgau's Record Guide
|rev2Score = B−
|rev4 = Rolling Stone (1971)
|rev4score = (unfavorable)
|rev5 = Rolling Stone (1999)
|rev5score = (favorable)
|rev3 = The New Rolling Stone Album Guide'|rev3score = 
| rev8 = Tom Hull – on the Web
| rev8Score = A−
}}Roots''''' is Curtis Mayfield’s second studio album, released in October 1971. Having received critical praise from a variety of publications, the album is regarded as not just one of Mayfield's best works but also as a classic release of the '70s soul era, with Allmusic critic Bruce Eder stating that "the album soars on some of the sweetest and most eloquent... soul sounds heard up to that time". The album became a commercial success as well, hitting the #6 slot on Billboard's Top R&B Albums chart.

Track listing

Original release 
All songs written and composed by Curtis Mayfield, except as noted.
"Get Down" – 5:45
"Keep On Keeping On" – 5:08
"Underground" – 5:15
"We Got to Have Peace" – 4:44
"Beautiful Brother of Mine" – 7:23
"Now You're Gone" (Mayfield, Joseph Scott) – 6:50
"Love to Keep You in My Mind" – 3:48

Bonus tracks 
In 1999, Rhino Records re-released the album with four bonus tracks including a demo version of "Underground" and single edits for "Get Down', "We Got to Have Peace" and "Beautiful Brother of Mine".

 "Underground" [demo version] – 3:17
 "Get Down" [Single edit] – 3:55
 "We Got to Have Peace" [Single edit] – 3:39
 "Beautiful Brother of Mine" [Single edit] – 3:09

Personnel
Curtis Mayfield - vocals, guitar
Craig McMullen - guitar
Joseph "Lucky" Scott - bass
Tyrone McCullen - drums
Henry Gibson - percussion
Leroy Hutson, Michael Hawkins - background vocals
Johnny Pate, Riley Hampton - arrangements

Chart positions

References 

1971 albums
Curtis Mayfield albums
Albums arranged by Johnny Pate
Albums produced by Curtis Mayfield
Curtom Records albums